Liskwartier is a neighborhood of Rotterdam, Netherlands.

External links
Neighborhood Liskwartier Rotterdam
Liskwartier in the war

Neighbourhoods of Rotterdam